Dharanendra is the Yaksha (attendant deity) of Parshvanatha,  twenty-third Tirthankara in Jainism. He enjoys an independent religious life and is very popular amongst Jains. According to the Jain tradition, when Parshvanatha was a prince, he saved two snakes that had been trapped in a log in an Kamath’s fire. Later, these snakes were reborn as Dharanendra, the lord of the underworld Naga Kingdom, and Padmavati. They, then sheltered Parshvanatha when he was harassed by Meghalin (Kamath reborn). Śvētāmbara tradition, however, does not list Padmavati among the main queens of Dharanendra.

Western Ganga literature states that Dharanendra was worshipped for acquiring sons.

In the Panchakuta Basadi at Kambadahalli ,Dharanendra is seen holding a bow and blowing a shankha. A five-hooded serpent makes a canopy over him.

See also 
 Uvasagharam Stotra
 Parshvanatha
 Padmavati (Jainism)

Notes

References

External links

Heavenly attendants in Jainism
Parshvanatha